Pro Rally 2001 is a video game of the racing genre released in 2000 by Ubi Soft. A sequel, Pro Rally 2002, was released in 2002.

Reception

Pro Rally 2001 was met with mixed reception, as GameRankings gave it a score of 63%. Eurogamer concluded that "The different Championship modes are all roughly the same, the teaching element is frustrating and badly planned, the handling and road-manners of the cars are dreadful, and there are plenty of others games available which do more of the same, only better.".

References

External links

2000 video games
Rally racing video games
Ubisoft games
Video games developed in Spain
Windows games
Windows-only games